Zhang Zhenfang was the last Viceroy of Zhili. He served from February 3, 1912, until the end of the Qing dynasty. Afterwards he served as the Governor of Henan. He was Yuan Shikai’s cousin.

References

Governors of Henan
Viceroys of Zhili